Asyma (Ahıma) is a rural locality (a selo) and the administrative center of Kirovsky Rural Okrug of Gorny District in the Sakha Republic, Russia, located  from Berdigestyakh, the administrative center of the district. Its population as of the 2002 Census was 642.

References

Citations

Sources
 

Rural localities in Gorny District